Prokhor Sergeyevich Poltapov (born 1 February 2003) is a Russian ice hockey right wing who plays for Krasnaya Armiya Moskva of the Junior Hockey League, the top junior league in Russia. He made his Kontinental Hockey League debut for CSKA Moscow during the 2020–21 season. Poltapov was drafted by the Buffalo Sabres of the National Hockey League as the first pick of the second round of the 2021 NHL Entry Draft.

References

External links
 

2003 births
Living people
CSKA Moscow
Buffalo Sabres draft picks
Krasnaya Armiya (MHL) players
Russian ice hockey right wingers
Ice hockey people from Saint Petersburg